In geometry and algebra, the triple product is a product of three 3-dimensional vectors, usually Euclidean vectors. The name "triple product" is used for two different products, the scalar-valued scalar triple product and, less often, the vector-valued vector triple product.

Scalar triple product 

The scalar triple product (also called the mixed product, box product, or triple scalar product) is defined as the dot product of one of the vectors with the cross product of the other two.

Geometric interpretation 
Geometrically, the scalar triple product

is the (signed) volume of the parallelepiped defined by the three vectors given. Here, the parentheses may be omitted without causing ambiguity, since the dot product cannot be evaluated first. If it were, it would leave the cross product of a scalar and a vector, which is not defined.

Properties 
 The scalar triple product is unchanged under a circular shift of its three operands (a, b, c):

 Swapping the positions of the operators without re-ordering the operands leaves the triple product unchanged. This follows from the preceding property and the commutative property of the dot product:

 Swapping any two of the three operands negates the triple product. This follows from the circular-shift property and the anticommutativity of the cross product:

 The scalar triple product can also be understood as the determinant of the  matrix that has the three vectors either as its rows or its columns (a matrix has the same determinant as its transpose):

 If the scalar triple product is equal to zero, then the three vectors a, b, and c are coplanar, since the parallelepiped defined by them would be flat and have no volume.
 If any two vectors in the scalar triple product are equal, then its value is zero:

 Also:

 The simple product of two triple products (or the square of a triple product), may be expanded in terms of dot products:This restates in vector notation that the product of the determinants of two 3×3 matrices equals the determinant of their matrix product. As a special case, the square of a triple product is a Gram determinant.
The ratio of the triple product and the product of the three vector norms is known as a polar sine:which ranges between -1 and 1.

Scalar or pseudoscalar
Although the scalar triple product gives the volume of the parallelepiped, it is the signed volume, the sign depending on the orientation of the frame or the parity of the permutation of the vectors. This means the product is negated if the orientation is reversed, for example by a parity transformation, and so is more properly described as a pseudoscalar if the orientation can change.

This also relates to the handedness of the cross product; the cross product transforms as a pseudovector under parity transformations and so is properly described as a pseudovector. The dot product of two vectors is a scalar but the dot product of a pseudovector and a vector is a pseudoscalar, so the scalar triple product must be pseudoscalar-valued.

If T is a rotation operator, then

but if T is an improper rotation, then

As an exterior product

In exterior algebra and geometric algebra the exterior product of two vectors is a bivector, while the exterior product of three vectors is a trivector. A bivector is an oriented plane element and a trivector is an oriented volume element, in the same way that a vector is an oriented line element.

Given vectors a, b and c, the product

is a trivector with magnitude equal to the scalar triple product, i.e.
,

and is the Hodge dual of the scalar triple product. Geometrically the trivector a ∧ b ∧ c corresponds to the parallelepiped spanned by a, b, and c, with bivectors ,  and  matching the parallelogram faces of the parallelepiped.

As a trilinear function
The triple product is identical to the volume form of the Euclidean 3-space applied to the vectors via interior product. It also can be expressed as a contraction of vectors with a rank-3 tensor equivalent to the form (or a pseudotensor equivalent to the volume pseudoform); see below.

Vector triple product 
The vector triple product is defined as the cross product of one vector with the cross product of the other two. The following relationship holds:

.

This is known as triple product expansion, or Lagrange's formula, although the latter name is also used for several other formulas. Its right hand side can be remembered by using the mnemonic "ACB − ABC", provided one keeps in mind which vectors are dotted together. A proof is provided below. Some textbooks write the identity as  such that a more familiar mnemonic "BAC − CAB" is obtained, as in “back of the cab”.

Since the cross product is anticommutative, this formula may also be written (up to permutation of the letters) as:

From Lagrange's formula it follows that the vector triple product satisfies:

which is the Jacobi identity for the cross product.  Another useful formula follows:

These formulas are very useful in simplifying vector calculations in physics. A related identity regarding gradients and useful in vector calculus is Lagrange's formula of vector cross-product identity:

This can be also regarded as a special case of the more general Laplace–de Rham operator .

Proof

By combining these three components we obtain:

Using geometric algebra
If geometric algebra is used the cross product b × c of vectors is expressed as their exterior product  b∧c, a bivector. The second cross product cannot be expressed as an exterior product, otherwise the scalar triple product would result. Instead a left contraction can be used, so the formula becomes

The proof follows from the properties of the contraction. The result is the same vector as calculated using a × (b × c).

Interpretations

Tensor calculus 
In tensor notation, the triple product is expressed using the Levi-Civita symbol:

and

referring to the -th component of the resulting vector. This can be simplified by performing a contraction on the Levi-Civita symbols, 
In the first term, we fix  and thus . Likewise, in the second term, we fix  and thus .

Returning to the triple cross product,

Vector calculus 

See also 

 Quadruple product
 Vector algebra relations

Notes

References

External links

 Khan Academy video of the proof of the triple product expansion

Articles containing proofs
Mathematical identities
Multilinear algebra
Operations on vectors
Ternary operations